Laharem Taluk (also Romanized as Lahārem Talūk and Lahārom Talūk) is a village in Bisheh Sar Rural District, in the Central District of Qaem Shahr County, Mazandaran Province, Iran. At the 2006 census, its population was 837, in 218 families.

References 

Populated places in Qaem Shahr County